Sir Edward Baldwin Malet, 4th Baronet  (10 October 1837 – 29 June 1908) was a British diplomat.

Edward Malet came from a family of diplomats; his father was Sir Alexander Malet, British minister to Württemberg and later to the German Confederation. After three years at Eton College, Edward Malet entered the foreign service at the age of 17. 
He served as attaché to his father in Frankfurt, then in Brussels.

He was trained in the diplomatic service by Richard Lyons, 1st Viscount Lyons, and was a member of the Tory-sympathetic 'Lyons School' of British diplomacy.

He served as Secretary of Legation at Peking (1871–1873), Athens (1873–1875), Rome (1875–1878), and Constantinople (1878–1879). Malet formed close ties with Ottoman sultan Abdul Hamid II ("Abdul the Damned")  during 1878, the year of the Treaties of San Stefano and Berlin.

Malet was appointed Agent and Consul-General in Egypt on 10 October 1879. He served there until 1883, pressing for administrative and financial reforms. He was at first sympathetic to Ahmed Orabi's demand for constitutional government. However, historians John Galbraith and Afaf al-Sayyid-Marsot write that after British-French Joint Note was sent to the Egyptian government, Malet gradually began to support the plans of the Gladstone Cabinet to intervene in Egypt, writing on 13 February 1882, "I am prejudiced against the Nationalists." He served a crucial role in the decision of Gladstone's Cabinet to invade Alexandria when he sent a telegram to the Cabinet that both exaggerated the instability of the Khedive's rule in Egypt and also advised the British government to conduct a naval demonstration off Alexandria. (see 1882 Anglo-Egyptian War). Galbraith and al-Sayyid-Marsot describe him as having been naive, in that he hoped the British would attempt to militarily intimidate Urabi, though he never expected an actual attack or occupation by British forces He later served as Minister to Belgium (1883–1884), and Ambassador to the German Empire (1884–1895).

In 1892 he built an immense Beaux-Arts villa "Le Chateau Malet" at Cap D’Ail, France.

On 19 March 1885, Edward Malet married Lady Ermyntrude Sackville Russell, daughter of Francis Russell, 9th Duke of Bedford and Lady Elizabeth Sackville-West.

The Malet Memorial Hall, a Tudor Revival-style building which had a church on its upper floor, was founded in his memory by his widow in 1912 in Bexhill-on-Sea.  It opened in October 1913.

Malet Street, a street in the Bloomsbury district of Central London, has been named in his honour.

Bibliography
 Malet,  Egypt, 1879-1883 (London, 1909) online

References
General

Specific

1837 births
1908 deaths
Ambassadors of the United Kingdom to Germany
Ambassadors of the United Kingdom to Belgium
Baronets in the Baronetage of Great Britain
British consuls-general in Egypt
Knights Grand Cross of the Order of St Michael and St George
Knights Grand Cross of the Order of the Bath
Members of the Privy Council of the United Kingdom
People educated at Eton College
People of the 'Urabi revolt